The following is a list of lakes in Ohio. These 2,200  include both public and private lakes. The United States Environmental Protection Agency estimated (from an electronic file generated from 1:100,000 scale maps) that Ohio has 5,130 lakes totaling . The difference in the number of lakes estimated by USEPA and ODNR is likely related to numerous small ponds (high number, small acreage) not detected on the 1:100,000 scale maps.

Great Lakes

One of the five Great Lakes is partially within Ohio.

Natural inland lakes

Artificial inland lakes

Notes 

345 USGS GNIS officially-named lakes in Ohio

1,255 USGS GNIS officially-named reservoirs in Ohio

References

Further reading

United States Board on Geographic Names, United States Geological Survey, United States Department of the Interior

Data taken from Ohio Department of Natural Resources:

Ohio Lake Fishing Maps

External links 
Ohio Department of Natural Resources

Lakes
Ohio